Donald Robert Fergusson Harleman (December 5, 1922 – September 28, 2005) was an American civil engineer noted for his research of the flow of contaminants through water and harbor cleanup efforts around the world.

Harleman was credited with cleanup efforts of harbors around the world: Australia, Brazil, China, India, and Mexico, among others. He advised government agencies on the Boston Harbor cleanup.
Harleman was elected to the National Academy of Engineering in 1974 "for leadership in the development of theoretical and experimental techniques in the field of fluid mechanics".
The Boston Globe called Harleman "an internationally recognized civil engineer in the field of water quality and waste treatment".
The New York Times said that Harleman "was regarded as a leader in fluid mechanics" and said he was "water pollution expert who aided cleanups worldwide".
Harleman was Ford Professor of Civil Engineering and Director of Ralph M. Parsons Laboratory at the Massachusetts Institute of Technology.

Chronology 
 1922: born on December  in Palmerton, Pennsylvania
 1943: B.S. in civil engineering, Pennsylvania State University
 1947: M.S., Massachusetts Institute of Technology
 1950: Doctorate, Massachusetts Institute of Technology
 1950: assistant professor of hydraulics, Massachusetts Institute of Technology
 1975-1990: Ford Professor of Environmental Engineering, Massachusetts Institute of Technology
 1991: retired from MIT as Ford Professor emeritus
 2005: died of cancer on September 28 on Nantucket, Massachusetts

References 

1922 births
2005 deaths
Engineers from Pennsylvania
MIT School of Engineering faculty
Penn State College of Engineering alumni
MIT School of Engineering alumni
Members of the United States National Academy of Engineering
People from Carbon County, Pennsylvania
Environmental scientists
20th-century American engineers